Kolol (also Romanized as Kolal; also known as Kolal-e Bālā, Kolal-e ‘Olyā, Kolol-e Bālā, and Kulūl) is a village in Khvormuj Rural District, in the Central District of Dashti County, Bushehr Province, Iran. At the 2006 census, its population was 941, in 212 families.

References 

Populated places in Dashti County